Mary Jane "Jennie" Bain Wilson (November 13, 1856 – September 3, 1913) was an American hymn writer.

Early life 
Mary Jane "Jennie" Bain Wilson was born on a farm in Cleveland, Indiana in 1856, the younger daughter of Robert Wilson and Mary Frances Russell Wilson. She survived typhoid fever as a little girl, but her spine was damaged by the bacterial infection ("typhoid spine" was first described in the medical literature many years later). She used a wheelchair from childhood and she was educated at home.

Career 
Wilson wrote thousands and published hundreds of Christian hymns; she was known as the "Fanny Crosby of the West". She also wrote poetry and spoke at Bible conferences in Indiana. Her hymn "Hold to God's Unchanging Hand" (1905) was especially popular in the 1910s and 1920s.

Wilson was also the author of the slogan of Fort Wayne, Indiana, "Fort Wayne with Might and Main", taking the $50 prize in the city's slogan contest, out of 25,000 submissions.

Personal life 
After 1902 Wilson lived with her married older sister. She sought some surgical treatment of her paralysis in Indianapolis, and "improved somewhat". Wilson died in 1913, aged 57 years, from kidney disease, in South Whitley, Indiana.

References

External links 

 
 Jennie Bain Wilson at Hymnary

1856 births
1913 deaths
Hymnwriters
People from South Whitley, Indiana
American women writers
Writers with disabilities